Exyra fax, the pitcher plant moth, is a moth of the family Noctuidae. It is mainly found on the Atlantic Coastal Plain and Great Lakes region of eastern North America (from Manitoba through Michigan to Nova Scotia and Maine south to Georgia. The species is listed as threatened in Connecticut.

The species is in decline due to disruption of bog hydrology and application of biocides.

Adults are on wing from June to August.

The larvae feed on Sarracenia purpurea.

References

External links
 Species info

Plusiinae
Moths of North America